Les Hauts-de-Chée is a commune in the Meuse department in Grand Est in north-eastern France.

The former towns of Génicourt-sous-Condé, Hargeville-sur-Chée, Louppy-sur-Chée (Loppy-le-Petit) and Les Marats (Marat-la-Grande, Marat-la-Petite) were joined to Condé-en-Barrois on 20 June 1972, which subsequently changed its name to Les Hauts-de-Chée on 1 July 1972.

Geography
The river Chée rises in the eastern part of the commune, then flows westward through the middle of the commune, crossing through several villages and hamlets.

See also
Communes of the Meuse department

References

Hautsdechee